Dzmitry Salei (born 3 November 1989) is a visually impaired Belarusian Paralympic swimmer who in 2014 switched national teams to Azerbaijan.

He competed for Belarus at the 2008 and 2012 Summer Paralympics winning the gold in the 100m butterfly S13.

References

External links 
 

1989 births
Living people
Azerbaijani male swimmers
Belarusian male swimmers
S13-classified Paralympic swimmers
Paralympic swimmers of Azerbaijan
Paralympic swimmers of Belarus
Paralympic silver medalists for Azerbaijan
Paralympic gold medalists for Belarus
Paralympic medalists in swimming
Swimmers at the 2008 Summer Paralympics
Swimmers at the 2012 Summer Paralympics
Swimmers at the 2016 Summer Paralympics
Swimmers at the 2020 Summer Paralympics
Medalists at the 2008 Summer Paralympics
Medalists at the 2016 Summer Paralympics
Medalists at the World Para Swimming Championships
Medalists at the World Para Swimming European Championships
World record holders in paralympic swimming